The New Democrat Coalition is a caucus in the House of Representatives of the United States Congress made up of Democrats, primarily liberals and centrists, who take a pro-business stance and a liberal-to-moderate approach to fiscal matters. Most members hold socially liberal views, though there is a wide array of views on such issues. 

As of the 118th Congress, the New Democrat Coalition is composed of 94 members, the second largest House Democrat ideological caucus, after the Congressional Progressive Caucus.

Overview 
The New Democrat Coalition is a caucus within the House of Representatives founded in 1997 by Representatives Cal Dooley, Jim Moran, and Tim Roemer.

The Coalition supported "Third Way" policies during the Presidency of Bill Clinton.  The Coalition consists of liberal, moderate, and centrist Democrats

The group is known as fiscally moderate and pro-business. For example, the New Democrat Coalition supports free trade and the high-tech sector. The New Democrat Coalition also supports immigration reform.

Ideologically, it is positioned between the House Progressive Caucus and the Blue Dog Coalition. The Coalition has been described as both socially liberal and in favor of free markets.

Electoral results

House of Representatives

Caucus Chairs 
Current caucus rules only allow for a single chair who serves a single, 2-year term. However, when the caucus began it permitted multiple chairs and 4-year terms.
 1997–2001: Cal Dooley (CA-20), Jim Moran (VA-8), Tim Roemer (IN-3)
 2001–2005: Jim Davis (FL-11), Ron Kind (WI-3), Adam Smith (WA-9)
 2005–2009: Ellen Tauscher (CA-10)
 2009–2013: Joe Crowley (NY-7)
 2013–2017: Ron Kind (WI-3)
 2017–2019: Jim Himes (CT-4)
 2019–2021: Derek Kilmer (WA-6)
 2021–2023: Suzan DelBene (WA-1)
 2023–present: Annie Kuster (NH-2)

Leadership 
As of the 118th United States Congress, the Coalition's leaders are as follows:

Chair: Annie Kuster (NH-02)
Vice Chair for Outreach: Salud Carbajal (CA-24)
Vice Chair for Member Services: Sharice Davids (KS-03)
Vice Chair for Communications: Brad Schneider (IL-10)
Vice Chair for Policy: Derek Kilmer (WA-06)
At-Large Leadership Member: Lori Trahan (MA-03)
Whip: Susie Lee (NV-03)
Freshman Leadership Representative: Nikki Budzinski (IL-13)
At-Large Leadership Member: Marc Veasey (TX-33)
Chair Emeritus: Suzan DelBene (WA-01)

Membership 

As of January 3, 2023, the New Democrat Coalition has 94 members. Those members include 93 U.S. Representatives and one non-voting delegate of the House of Representatives.

Of those, 23 are simultaneously members of the Progressives while 4 are Blue Dogs

' Also member of the Congressional Progressive Caucus

† Also member of the Blue Dog Coalition

See also 
 Blue Dog Coalition
 Congressional Progressive Caucus
 Cultural liberalism
 Democratic Leadership Council
 New Democrats
 Republican Governance Group
 Republican Main Street Partnership
 Third Way (United States)

References

External links 
 New Democrat Coalition
 DLC: New Democrats Form House Coalition (March 11, 1997)

Centrist political advocacy groups in the United States
Democratic Party (United States) organizations
Ideological caucuses of the United States Congress
Liberalism in the United States
Centrism in the United States
Factions in the Democratic Party (United States)